Zhang Zao (December 29, 1962March 8, 2010) was one of the most important Chinese poets of the 20th century. He was considered one of the "Five Masters from Sichuan" in the 80s' Chinese poetry scene, along with other famous poets Bai Hua, Ouyang Jianghe, Zhai Yongming, and Zhong Ming. These poets are sometimes said to belong to the "Post-Hermeticist School" (German: die Posthermetische Schule) of poetry.

Zhang's writing was sparse, having written for half a century but left behind only about 130 poems. He is arguably most famous for his debut poem in his early twenties, titled In the Mirror, with the much quoted lines, "once regrets come to mind, plum blossoms fall and cover the Southern Mountain" (只要想起一生中后悔的事 / 梅花便落满了南山). His style of poetry is described as "enigmatic", "complex" and "elegant", balancing between contemporary techniques and various aspects of classical Chinese literature aesthetics. Being able to speak English, German and French, as well as Russian and Latin to some degree of familiarity, He was also able to write with a certain sort of "multilingualist" property, drawing inspirations from other languages.

Zhang died of lung cancer on 8 March 2010 at the age of 48 at Tübingen University Hospital in Germany. The only collection of his works published pre-humously is Letters in Four Seasons , which contains 63 poems, selected by the poet himself.

Footnotes

References 

20th-century Chinese poets
1962 births
2010 deaths
Poets from Sichuan